John Chih-Tsung Chien (given name also romanized Qǐcōng; ; March 23, 1940 – March 5, 2013) was a Taiwanese Episcopalian bishop who served as the third Bishop of Taiwan (diocesan bishop of the Episcopal Diocese of Taiwan) from 1988 to 2001.

Chien was made deacon on May 21, 1967, ordained priest on November 30, 1967 and consecrated bishop on March 25, 1988.

References

1940 births
2013 deaths
20th-century American Episcopalians
Episcopal bishops of Taiwan